WFOX-TV (channel 30) is a television station in Jacksonville, Florida, United States, affiliated with Fox and Telemundo. It is owned by Cox Media Group, which provides certain services to CBS affiliate WJAX-TV (channel 47) under a joint sales agreement (JSA) with Hoffman Communications. The stations share studios on Central Parkway, while WFOX-TV's transmitter is located on Hogan Road, both in Jacksonville's Southside section.

History

Early history in 1980s
The station first signed on the air on February 15, 1981, as WAWS-TV (the "-TV" suffix was dropped from the call letters on October 8, 1981); it was the first general-entertainment independent station to sign-on in the Jacksonville market. It signed on more than a year after the market's first non-network station, WXAO-TV (channel 47, later future sister station WJAX). However, WXAO was mostly a religious station. The station's original studios and transmitter facilities were located on Hogan Road on Jacksonville's Southside, part of the Killarney Shores antenna farm. WAWS-TV was originally owned by Crown Broadcasting; shortly before it signed on, the station was sold to Malrite Communications, owner of ABC affiliate WCTI in New Bern, North Carolina. and independent station WUHF in Rochester, New York. WAWS-TV maintained a general entertainment format consisting of cartoons, movies, sitcoms and drama series.

WAWS became a charter affiliate of the Fox Broadcasting Company when the network launched on October 9, 1986. As was the case with other Fox stations during the network's early years, channel 30 continued to program itself in the manner of an independent station as Fox's initial schedule consisted of an hour of late night programming on Monday through Friday evenings, while the later addition of a prime time schedule in April 1987 only consisted of programming during that time period on weekends (Fox would not carry a full seven nights a week of programming until September 1993). Until Fox began airing programming on a nightly basis, WAWS aired a feature film at 8:00 p.m. on nights when the network did not offer any programming.

Clear Channel ownership
In 1989, Malrite sold the station to the San Antonio-based Clear Channel Communications (now iHeartMedia), which had earlier purchased the first independent station in the nearby Pensacola/Mobile, Alabama market, WPMI-TV (now an NBC affiliate) and was the first television station that Clear Channel ever owned. As was the trend for many Fox affiliates throughout the mid to late 1990s, WAWS began shifting its programming toward talk and reality shows and decreased its reliance on classic sitcoms. In 1995, Clear Channel began managing channel 47—later to become WNFT—under a local marketing agreement; the two stations pooled programming and resources, while running the strongest syndicated programs on WAWS. Clear Channel purchased channel 47, which by that point had become UPN affiliate WTEV-TV, outright in 2000, creating the second television duopoly in the Jacksonville market.

After WTEV took the CBS affiliation from longtime affiliate WJXT (channel 4), which dropped the network after it demanded that Post-Newsweek Stations reverse compensate CBS to carry its programming and run the entire network schedule in pattern—only allowing preemptions for extended local breaking news and severe weather coverage, WAWS took over the local rights to the UPN affiliation on July 15, 2002, airing the network's evening programming on a secondary basis each weeknight from 11:00 p.m. to 1:00 a.m. following the station's prime time newscast, as well as its children's program block Disney's One Too, which it aired on Sunday through Friday mornings in addition to its existing carriage of Fox's competing children's block, FoxBox (later known as 4Kids TV), on Saturdays. It also acquired several syndicated sitcoms that WTEV no longer had room to carry on its schedule. The shift made Jacksonville one of the only television markets in the United States where all six major broadcast networks at the time (ABC, CBS, NBC, Fox, UPN and The WB) collectively held affiliations with only five stations in a six-station market (which remains the case with UPN and The WB's successors The CW and MyNetworkTV in the present day) and the only market in which each of the Big Four network affiliates are controlled by two companies (at the time, the Gannett Company owned NBC affiliate WTLV (channel 12) and ABC affiliate WJXX (channel 25), both of which are now owned by its broadcasting and digital media spin-off Tegna Inc.).

On January 24, 2006, the Warner Bros. unit of Time Warner and CBS Corporation announced that the two companies would respectively shut down UPN and The WB, and enter into a joint venture to form a new "fifth" broadcast television network, The CW, that would initially feature a mix of higher-rated programming from both of its forerunner networks (and assumed the scheduling model and most programming operations of The WB) as well as new content developed specifically for The CW. On February 22, 2006, News Corporation announced the launch of MyNetworkTV, a new "sixth" broadcast network operated by Fox Television Stations and its syndication division Twentieth Television that was created to compete against The CW, as well as to give UPN- and WB-affiliated stations that were not named as charter CW affiliates another option besides converting into independent stations.

On March 28 of that year, then-owner Media General announced that WB affiliate WJWB (channel 17) would become the market's charter affiliate of The CW (it would later change its call letters to WCWJ). On July 12, Clear Channel confirmed that WAWS would become the Jacksonville area affiliate of MyNetworkTV, which it would carry on a new second digital subchannel. However, until the new second digital subchannel launched, WAWS carried MyNetworkTV programming on its main channel weeknights from 11:00 p.m. to 1:00 a.m. in the interim. MyNetworkTV programming moved to WAWS-DT2 once the subchannel signed on in January 2007, airing in the recommended 8:00 to 10:00 p.m. time slot, with programming from the Variety Television Network (MeTV since 2011) airing at all other times.

Newport Television ownership
On April 20, 2007, Clear Channel entered into an agreement to sell its television stations to Newport Television, a newly formed television station group controlled by private equity firm Providence Equity Partners. Since WTEV was also included in the deal, this would have violated FCC rules preventing a single company from holding common ownership of two of the four highest-rated stations in a single market as Clear Channel had bought WTEV when it was a UPN affiliate that had lower ratings which placed it outside of the commission's total-day ratings criteria for duopolies (by this point, WTEV surpassed WJXT and WCWJ in the total-day viewership). As a result, the FCC granted Newport Television a temporary waiver to acquire WAWS and WTEV, provided that Newport sell one of the two stations within six months of the sale's consummation. After the group deal closed on March 14, 2008, Newport had originally planned to sell off WAWS to another company while keeping WTEV.

On May 21, 2008, High Plains Broadcasting agreed to purchase the license assets of WTEV and six other stations from Newport Television due to ownership conflicts in the affected markets (including Jacksonville). However, since this particular transaction was conducted as a sale in name only, Newport continued to operate the stations under a shared services agreement (therefore, resulting in WTEV remaining a sister outlet to WAWS) after the sale was completed on September 15. It effectively made High Plains Broadcasting a front company or "shell corporation" for Newport Television, similar to the existing relationships between the Nexstar Broadcasting Group and Mission Broadcasting and the Sinclair Broadcast Group and Cunningham Broadcasting. This arrangement also placed WAWS in the unusual position of being the senior partner as a Fox-affiliated station in a virtual duopoly with a CBS affiliate (the Fox station normally serves as the junior partner in most virtual or legal duopolies involving a Fox affiliate and a Big Three-affiliated station). WAWS is the only television station in the Jacksonville market that has never changed its primary network affiliation.

Cox Media Group ownership
On July 19, 2012, Newport Television announced the sale of WAWS and WTEV-TV to the Cox Media Group, in a four-station deal that also involved the sister duopoly of Fox affiliate KOKI-TV and MyNetworkTV affiliate KMYT-TV in Tulsa, Oklahoma. The sale to Cox placed WAWS and WTEV under common ownership with the company's radio station cluster in Jacksonville (WOKV (690 AM and 106.5 FM, now WXXJ), WFYV-FM (104.5, now WOKV-FM), WJGL (96.9), WXXJ (102.9, now WEZI) and WAPE-FM (95.1)) as well as Cox's Orlando duopoly of ABC affiliate WFTV and independent station WRDQ. Due to the very same rules that forced the license of WTEV to be transferred to a separate licensee back in 2008, Cox acquired WAWS outright and transferred WTEV's license assets to Bayshore Television, LLC, which then entered into a joint sales agreement with Cox. The FCC approved the transaction on October 24, and the three companies involved finalized the deal on December 3.

On August 26, 2014, Cox announced its intention to change WAWS' call letters to WFOX-TV, contingent on FCC approval, through a request made to the agency on July 30. In an email to The Florida Times-Union, general manager Jim Zerwekh stated that the change would better reflect the station's status as one of Fox's ten strongest affiliates. The use of the callsign differs from other stations that incorporate their network partner's name into their call letters—a usage originated by the coastal flagship owned-and-operated stations of ABC, NBC and CBS based in New York City and Los Angeles. However, the WFOX calls were not used by Fox for its O&O in New York City, which bears the calls WNYW, partly derived from the former WNEW callsign it had prior to former parent Metromedia's 1986 purchase by the network's original parent company News Corporation. A similar situation exists with KFOX-TV in El Paso, Texas, which Cox owned from 1996 to 2013 (now owned by the Sinclair Broadcast Group), and had adopted those calls in 1994 as they were not already used by Fox's Los Angeles O&O, which uses its legacy KTTV callsign. Concurrently with the change to WFOX-TV, sister station WTEV-TV was renamed WJAX-TV. The change took effect on September 7, 2014.

In February 2019, it was announced that Apollo Global Management would acquire Cox Media Group and Northwest Broadcasting's stations. Although the group planned to operate under the name Terrier Media, it was later announced in June 2019 that Apollo would also acquire Cox's radio and advertising businesses, and retain the Cox Media Group name. The sale was completed on December 17, 2019.

News operation
WFOX-TV presently broadcasts 50 hours of locally produced newscasts each week (with eight hours each weekday and five hours each on Saturdays and Sundays); in addition, the station produces the half-hour sports highlight program Action Sports Jax Primetime, which airs weekend evenings at 10:30 p.m. The stations utilize Doppler radar data from the National Weather Service Forecast Office near Jacksonville International Airport.

In 1991, then-ABC affiliate WJKS (now WCWJ) entered into a news share agreement with WAWS to produce a nightly prime time newscast at 10:00, titled Fox 30 First Coast News (not to be confused with the present day First Coast News operation shared between WTLV and WJXX). Shortly before WJKS announced that it would shut down its news department in preparation for the loss of its ABC affiliation to WJXX, Clear Channel decided to invest in a news department for WAWS. The WJKS-produced newscast ended when that station's news department shut down on December 29, 1996; WAWS launched its own in-house news department the following day on December 30, 1996, with the debut of a half-hour nightly 10:00 p.m. newscast, which was also accompanied by a half-hour 11:00 p.m. newscast on weeknights (the latter broadcast would eventually be moved to 10:30, expanding the prime time newscast to one hour).

Over the next few years, more newscasts would be added: a 3½-hour weekday morning newscast (in 1999) and an hour-long 4:00 p.m. newscast on weekdays (in 2001); WAWS also began producing a weeknight 6:30 p.m. newscast for sister station WTEV in 1999. After WTEV switched from UPN to CBS in July 2002, that station began managing the shared news department with WAWS and took over primary production of the newscasts on both stations; channel 47 also substantially expanded its local news programming, adding a full slate newscasts at 5:30 a.m. (effectively "moving" over to that station from WAWS, which replaced the program with religious programming and children's programming from the Disney's One Too block upon its simultaneous assumption of UPN programming), noon, 5:00, 5:30, 6:00 and 11:00 p.m. on Monday through Fridays, along with weekend evening newscasts. Initially, both stations maintained certain primary personnel (such as news anchors) that would only appear on either WAWS or WTEV. In addition, newscasts used separate on-air branding and graphics packages, with WTEV's newscasts being conducted from the duopoly's newsroom in order to distinguish the two outlets and retain separate on-air identities. WAWS would eventually cancel the 4:00 p.m. newscast in 2007.

The stations hired Mark Spain (who previously served as 7:00 p.m. anchor on WJXX), who joined WAWS/WTEV as anchor of channel 30's 10:00 p.m. newscast on August 27, 2007. Ironically, the station also hired First Coast News weekday morning traffic reporter Michelle Jacobs just weeks earlier (she would eventually return to WTLV and WJXX in October 2008). Shortly after she left, WAWS hired Julie Watkins (who previously worked at First Coast News before moving on to WFTV in Orlando) as a weekend meteorologist. In the late 2000s, WTEV's weekday morning newscast began to be simulcast on WAWS. Corresponding with the change, Action News This Morning was expanded to two hours (from 5:00 to 7:00), with a two-hour extension of the program (from 7:00 to 9:00 a.m.) eventually being added on WAWS.

On April 13, 2009, WTEV and WAWS began utilizing a single on-air identity for their respective newscasts, branding their news programming collectively as Action News, presumably done as a way to compete with the First Coast News operation of rivals WTLV and WJXX. With the overhaul came the introduction of new sets (with WAWS maintaining a separate set for its nightly 10:00 p.m. newscast), on-air graphics, weather center and website. On January 31, 2010, WTEV/WAWS became the second television news operation in the Jacksonville market to begin broadcasting their local newscasts in high definition (after WJXT, which upgraded on January 14, 2009; WTLV/WJXX upgraded their newscasts to HD the day after WAWS/WTEV's conversion to high definition newscasts). In 2010, WAWS/WTEV began airing a half-hour extension of its weekday morning newscast for channel 30 at 4:30 a.m. (WTEV continues to start its morning newscast at 5:00 a.m. as it carries the CBS Morning News in the 4:30 slot on a half-hour tape delay). On September 19, 2010, WAWS restored its "Fox 30" brand for its news programming, adopting a new logo and graphics package by Hothaus Creative (and originally created for fellow Fox affiliate KSWB-TV in San Diego in 2008 for its relaunch of its in-house newscasts) based on the standardized look of Fox's owned-and-operated stations.

On May 28, 2014, Cox Media Group management fired five WAWS/WTEV anchors—weeknight anchors Mark Spain, Tera Barz (who anchored the station's 10:00 p.m. newscast) and Paige Kelton (the latter of whom had been with the news department since it launched, originally serving as anchor of WAWS's 10:00 and 11:00 p.m. newscasts), and morning anchors Lynnsey Gardner and Mike Barz—in a restructuring of its news staff; all five anchors left the stations on or around September 1. The layoffs drew criticism from Jacksonville city council president Bill Guilford stating that Cox Media Group "exercised bad judgment" in cutting the five anchors.

On September 27, 2014, WFOX-TV expanded Action News This Morning to weekends with a three-hour Saturday broadcast from 6:00 to 9:00 a.m., and a two-hour Sunday broadcast from 6:00 to 8:00 a.m. Unlike the 5:00 to 7:00 a.m. portion of the weekday morning edition of the program, the weekend morning newscast is not simulcast on WJAX-TV. On January 11, 2016, WFOX premiered an hour-long early evening newscast at 6:00 p.m. on Monday through Friday nights; the first half-hour is a simulcast of WJAX's existing 6:00 newscast, while the second half-hour (during which time WJAX airs the CBS Evening News) is exclusive to WFOX.

Notable current on-air staff
 Mike Buresh (AMS Certified Broadcast Meteorologist Seal of Approval) – chief meteorologist

Notable former on-air staff
 Mike Barz – anchor
 Mark Spain – anchor

Technical information

Subchannels
The station's digital signal is multiplexed:

Analog-to-digital conversion
On June 12, 2009, WFOX-TV (as WAWS) terminated its analog signal, on UHF channel 30, as part of the federally mandated transition from analog to digital television. The station's digital signal remained on its pre-transition UHF channel 32. Through the use of PSIP, digital television receivers display WFOX-TV's virtual channel as 30.

References

External links

MeTV Jacksonville website

Television channels and stations established in 1981
Fox network affiliates
MyNetworkTV affiliates
MeTV affiliates
Heroes & Icons affiliates
Telemundo network affiliates
FOX-TV
Cox Media Group
1981 establishments in Florida